Mumbi Maina (born 14 January 1985) is a Kenyan actress known for her role in the soap opera Mali.

She is an actor and dancer who has starred in both local and international films since 2009.

Mumbi is well known for her role as Zakia in the netflix sci-fi show Sense8. After garnering her first play in 2009,she played Riziki in "Unseen Unsung Unforgotten" and won her first Kalasha award for the best supporting actress.

Mumbi became a household name through the award-winning NTV show Mali (2011-2013) and received her  Kalasha nominations for the Best Supporting actress.

She has starred in more other films including DSTVs Africa Magic Original films such as; such as 29, Terra Firma, Being Oti, Lovers Ransom and Runaway Groom.

Career
Mumbi Maina made her debut in the entertainment world in 2008 when she starred in the film Unseen, Unsung, Unforgotten as Riziki. She appeared alongside Benta Ochieng' and Nice Githinji. The story mainly focused on HIV/AIDS. In 2011, she was cast as one of the leads in the Kenyan soap opera Mali. In November 2011, she shared credits with Rita Dominic and Robert Burale in the film Shattered. In early 2015, she starred in the television series How to Find a Husband. She plays Jackie, who is friends with Abigail and Carol. She works alongside Lizz Njagah and Sarah Hassan.

Filmography

Film and television

References

Kati Kati’: Film Review | AFI Fest 2016

External links

1985 births
Kenyan television actresses
Kenyan film actresses
Living people
21st-century Kenyan actresses